Armand is a fictional character in The Vampire Chronicles novels written by Anne Rice. At the end of the series, he is approximately 500 years of age. His outward appearance is that of a beautiful adolescent boy, 5’6, with curly auburn hair, large brown eyes and slender fingers. His features are at times compared figuratively to those of Cupid or a Botticelli angel.

Fictional biography

As a human
Armand is born in 1481 in the former Kievan Rus' to the acclaimed hunter Ivan. His original name is Andrei.

As a child he can paint vivid pictures of Jesus Christ, Madonna, and the Eastern Orthodox Saints. His astonished parents eventually reveal his gift to the monks in the Monastery of the Caves, who live ascetically underground, sustained only by water and small amounts of food. Both the monks and Andrei believe he is destined to live such a life, while his father is appalled by the idea. When their ruler, Prince Michael, orders Andrei to paint an icon and bring it to the castle of his brother, the supposedly dead Prince Feodor, Andrei is captured by Tartars, brought as a slave to Constantinople, and subsequently sold to a Venetian brothel, where he is sexually abused and develops amnesia.

Marius, a 1500-year-old vampire living as a painter in Venice, rescues Andrei and gives him an education and a luxurious life, and renames him Amadeo. Marius is in love with a courtesan named Bianca Solderini, yet cannot bring himself to turn her into a vampire. Instead, he chooses Amadeo for his beauty, youth, and painting skills (apparently lost, along with his memories) to educate "in the way of the blood", so as to eventually make him a vampire. Amadeo loves Marius single-mindedly and is eager to become a vampire. He does not understand Marius' hesitation to turn him, and in an act of rebellion and anger he seduces an English lord, whom he eventually abandons after a few nights. The English lord becomes obsessed with Amadeo and, enraged by his betrayal, wounds him with a poisoned blade, forcing Marius to turn Amadeo into a vampire to save his life. Amadeo is 17 years old at the time of his transformation.

As a vampire
Shortly after Amadeo becomes a vampire, Marius' palazzo is attacked by a Satanic cult of vampires led by the vampire Santino. The cultists set Marius on fire, kidnap Amadeo and the other children at the palazzo, and take them to Rome. Santino tortures Amadeo by burning his friends to death before him and starves him in a cellar until he is forced to feed on his best friend and innocent children. After five months of psychological torture, Amadeo is ready to believe everything the cult says in exchange for their love and to forget all he has known. Because of his strength, he is named the leader of the Parisian coven in 1580 and renamed Armand, since a name with the word God (Deo) in it seems unfit for the leader of a satanic coven.

Roughly two hundred years later, the cult tries to capture Lestat, a vampire turned by Magnus—another old target of the coven—and considers destroying him. Still, Lestat is stronger than Armand and declares them ridiculous and unfit for the times in which they live. He disproves their beliefs that they could not look upon crosses, walk into churches, or live in places of light. Realizing that Lestat is right about the coven's obsolescence, Armand falls into despair and destroys most of his own followers. He tries to persuade Lestat to take him along on his journey, but Lestat refuses. Instead, Armand joins the Théâtre des Vampires and learns to move among mortals.

In the late 19th century, Lestat's fledglings Claudia and Louis happen upon the theater. Armand sees Louis as a new possibility of integrating into the modern world. When he cannot persuade Louis to leave Claudia, he kills her by burning her to death in the sun, and then lets Louis burn the theater with the vampires in it so they can leave together. They stay together until around the 1920s, then part because Louis has never fully recovered from the loss of Claudia, and knows that Armand is at least partly responsible for her death.

After the incidents in Interview with the Vampire, Daniel Molloy tries to find Lestat but is instead found by Armand. Daniel links Armand to the new time, and they form a relationship. Daniel grows more impatient, longing to be turned to a vampire, and he and Armand become estranged. By 1985, Daniel destroys his health to the point that he is near death, so Armand finally turns him into a vampire. Daniel is Armand's only fledgling to date, and they cannot stay together afterward.

When Lestat brings back Veronica's Veil from his journey in Memnoch the Devil, Armand is struck by the sight of it; his religious fervor revived, he goes into the sun in an attempt to destroy and redeem himself. He not only survives but manages to save a girl named Sybelle from her abusive brother. Sybelle and her protector, Benji, restore Armand with the blood of a drug dealer, and the three of them become very close. When Armand dictates the book The Vampire Armand to David Talbot, former head of the Talamasca and by then Lestat's fledgling, he leaves Sybelle and Benji in Marius' care. The latter then turns them into vampires.

Portrayal in other media
In the 1994 film Interview with the Vampire, Armand was portrayed by Antonio Banderas.  Contrary to his book description, this version of Armand is a fully-grown adult (of Spanish origin instead of Slavic) when he is turned into a vampire. While he does not kill Claudia like he did in the book, he allows her to die by Santiago's hands and only comes to Louis' aid when he is nearly killed as well. Unlike the book, Louis and Armand do not get together, with Louis parting ways with him after the fall of the Parisian coven. Louis is unable to accept Armand's way of life, which meant forgetting his tragedies like they never existed, and also knows he had allowed Claudia to die.
In the 2002 film Queen of the Damned, Armand was portrayed by Matthew Newton.
In the 2006 musical, Lestat, Armand was first portrayed by Jack Noseworthy, who left the role a week after the pre-Broadway performance began, and was then replaced by his understudy Drew Sarich, who went with the production onto Broadway.
In the 2022 AMC TV series Interview with the Vampire, Louis reveals in the series one finale that his servant Rashid (portrayed by Assad Zaman) has actually been "the vampire Armand" all along.

References

External links
 

Characters in The Vampire Chronicles
Fictional bisexual males
Literary characters introduced in 1976
Fictional characters who can move at superhuman speeds
Fictional characters with superhuman strength
Fictional characters with accelerated healing
Fictional vampires
Fictional murderers of children
Fictional cult leaders
Fictional Ukrainian people
Fictional slaves
Male literary villains
Fictional LGBT characters in film
LGBT villains
Fictional LGBT characters in literature